In mathematics, the Cayley configuration space of a linkage over a set of its non-edges , called Cayley parameters, is the set of distances attained by  over all its frameworks, under some -norm. Note that this description may not be a bijection. The motivation for using distance parameters is to define a continuous quadratic branched covering from the configuration space of a linkage to a simpler, often convex, space. Hence, obtaining a framework from a Cayley configuration space of a linkage over some set of non-edges is often a matter of solving quadratic equations.

Cayley configuration spaces have a close relationship to the flattenability and combinatorial rigidity of graphs.

Definitions

Cayley Configuration Space 
Definition via Linkages. In the presence of inequality -distance constraints, i.e., an interval , the Cayley configuration space  is defined analogously.

Definition via projections of the distance cone. Consider the cone  of vectors of pairwise -distances between  points.

In the presence of inequality -distance constraints, i.e., an interval , the Cayley configuration space  is the projection of a set of fibers onto the set of non-edges .

Definition via branching covers.

Oriented Cayley Configuration Space 
For a -dof tree-decomposable graph  with base non-edge , each point of a framework of a linkage  in  under the -norm can be placed iteratively according to an orientation vector , also called a realization type.

Minimal complete Cayley vector 
For a -dof tree-decomposable graph  with low Cayley complexity on a base non-edge , a minimal Cayley vector  is a list of  non-edges of  such that the graph  is generically globally rigid.

Properties

Single Interval Property. 
A pair , consisting of a graph  and a non-edge , has the single interval property in  under some -norm if, for every linkage , the Cayley configuration space  is a single interval.

Inherent Convexity 

Genericity with respect to convexity 
As defined in, the framework  is generic with respect to the property of convex Cayley configuration spaces if

  is convex if and only if, for all ,  is convex.

Theorem.  Every generic framework of a graph  in  has a convex Cayley configuration space over a set of non-edges  if and only if every linkage  does.

Theorem.  Convexity of Cayley configuration spaces is not a generic property of frameworks.

Proof. Consider the graph in Figure 1.

Thus, one generic framework has a convex Cayley configuration space while another does not.

Generic Completeness 
Equivalently, the graph  is generically minimally-rigid.

Results for the Euclidean norm 
This sections gives results on Cayley configuration spaces of linkages over non-edges under the -norm, also called the Euclidean norm.

Single Interval Theorems 
Let  be a graph.

Theorem.  For , the pair , consisting of a graph  and a non-edge , has the single interval property in  if and only if all minimal -sum components of  that contain  are partial -trees.

The latter condition is equivalent to requiring that all minimal -sum components of  that contain  are -flattenable, as partial -trees are exactly the class of -flattenable graphs (see results on -flattenability). This result does not generalize for dimensions . The forbidden minors for -flattenability are the complete graph  and the -skeleton of the octahedron  (see results on -flattenability). Both pairs  and  have the single interval property in : the vertices of  can rotate in -dimensions around a plane. However, neither  nor  is -flattenable: contracting  in  yields  and contracting  in  yields .

Example. The graph  is its own and only minimal -sum component containing either non-edge. Additionally, the graph  is a -tree, so  is a partial -tree.

Conjecture.

1-dof tree-decomposable linkages in  
Refer to tree-decomposable graphs for the definition of generic linkages used below.

Theorem.  For a generic 1-dof tree-decomposable linkage  with base non-edge  the following hold:

 An oriented Cayley configuration space  is a set of disjoint closed real intervals or empty;

This theorem yields an algorithm to compute (oriented) Cayley configuration spaces of 1-dof tree-decomposable linkages over a base non-edge by simply constructing oriented frameworks of all extreme linkages, see constructing a tree-decomposable framework.  This algorithm can take time exponential in the size of the linkage and in the output Cayley configuration space.  For a 1-dof tree-decomposable graph , three complexity measures of its oriented Cayley configuration spaces are:

 Cayley size: the maximum number of disjoint closed real intervals in the Cayley configuration space over all linkages ;
 Cayley computational complexity: the maximum time complexity to obtain these intervals over all linkages ; and
 Cayley algebraic complexity: the maximum algebraic complexity of describing each endpoint of these intervals over all linkages .

Bounds on these complexity measures are given in.  See results on tree-decomposable graphs.  Another algorithm to compute these oriented Cayley configuration spaces achieves linear Cayley complexity in the size of the underlying graph.

Theorem.  For a generic 1-dof tree-decomposable linkage , where the graph  has low Cayley complexity on a base non-edge , the following hold:

 and the time complexity to find such a path, if it exists, is linear in the number of interval endpoints of the oriented Cayley configuration space over  that the path contains; and
 and the time complexity of generating each such component is linear in the number of interval endpoints of the oriented Cayley configuration space over  that the component contains.

An algorithm is given in to find these motion paths.  The idea is to start from one framework located in one interval of the Cayley configuration space, travel along the interval to its endpoint, and jump to another interval, repeating these last two steps until the target framework is reached.  This algorithm utilizes the following facts: (i) there is a continuous motion path between any two frameworks in the same interval, (ii) extreme linkages only exist at the endpoints of an interval, and (iii) during the motion, the low Cayley complexity linkage only changes its realization type when jumping to a new interval and exactly one local orientation changes sign during this jump.

Example.  Figure 4 shows an oriented framework of a 1-dof tree-decomposable linkage with base non-edge , located in an interval of the Cayley configuration space, and two other frameworks whose orientations are about to change.  The vertices corresponding to construction steps are labelled in order of construction.  More specifically, the first framework has the realization type .  There is a continuous motion path to the second framework, which has the realization type .  Hence, this framework corresponds to an interval endpoint and jumping to a new interval results in the realization type .  Likewise, the third framework is corresponds to an interval endpoint with the realization type  and jumping to a new interval results in the realization type .

Theorem.

Results for general p-norms 
This section covers the results that can be extended to general -norms.

Theorem.  For general -norms, a graph  has an inherent convex Cayley configuration space in  if and only if  is -flattenable.

The "only if" direction was proved in using the fact that the  distance cone  is convex.  As a direct consequence, -flattenable graphs and graphs with inherent convex Cayley configuration spaces in  have the same forbidden minor characterization.  See Graph Flattenability for results on these characterizations, as well as a more detailed discussion on the connection between Cayley configuration spaces and flattenability.

Example. Consider the graph in Figure 3 with both non-edges added as edges.

Applications 
This algorithm has applications in molecular self-assembly.

References 

Mathematics